La Celestina P... R... is a 1965 Italian comedy film directed by Carlo Lizzani. It is loosely based on the Medieval novel La Celestina by Fernando de Rojas.

The film marked the film comeback of Assia Noris after a 15 years break; it is also her last film.

Cast 
Assia Noris: Celestina
Venantino Venantini: Carlo
Massimo Serato: Marcello
Piero Mazzarella: Moretti
Franco Nero: Fabrizio
Marilù Tolo: Silvana
Beba Lončar: Luisella
Raffaella Carrà: Bruna
Goffredo Alessandrini: Montesti
Daliah Lavi: Daniela

References

External links

1965 films
Films directed by Carlo Lizzani
Films scored by Piero Umiliani
Italian comedy films
1965 comedy films
1960s Italian films